An anchor portal or H-frame tower is a gantry structure supporting overhead power lines in a switchyard. Their static function is similar to a dead-end tower. Anchor portals are almost always steel-tube or steel-framework constructions.

Gallery 

Pylons
Electric power infrastructure